Farm, Field, and Stockman was a weekly American newsletter published in 1884 in the Farm, Field, and Fireside family of farming and home newsletters. Its slogan was: "Agriculture, Gardening, Livestock, and Home Literature." It was merged in 1901 with Chicago, Illinois newspaper Model Farmer and became Farm, Field, Stockman and Model Farmer. After the merger, the newsletter was again combined with Wisconsin Agriculturalist in 1902.

References

External links 
 Illinois Digital Newspaper Collections: Farm, Field, and Stockman (1885-1887)

Publications established in 1884
Defunct newspapers published in Chicago
Weekly newspapers published in the United States